The New World Translation of the Holy Scriptures (NWT) is a translation of the Bible published by the Watch Tower Bible and Tract Society; it is used and distributed by Jehovah's Witnesses.  The New Testament portion was released first, in 1950, as The New World Translation of the Christian Greek Scriptures,  with the complete New World Translation of the Bible released in 1961.

It is not the first Bible to be published by the Watch Tower Society, but it is its first original translation of ancient Biblical Hebrew, Koine Greek, and Old Aramaic biblical texts. Although commentators have said a scholarly effort went into the translation, critics have described it as "biased".

History 
Until the release of the New World Translation, Jehovah's Witnesses in English-speaking countries primarily used the King James Version. According to the publishers, one of the main reasons for producing a new translation was that most Bible versions in common use, including the Authorized Version (King James), employed archaic language. The stated intention was to produce a fresh translation, free of archaisms. Additionally, over the centuries since the King James Version was produced, more copies of earlier manuscripts of the original texts in the Hebrew and Greek languages have become available. According to the publishers, better manuscript evidence had made it possible to determine with greater accuracy what the original writers intended, particularly in more obscure passages, allowing linguists to better understand certain aspects of the original languages.

A fresh translation of the New Testament, which Jehovah's Witnesses usually refer to as the Christian Greek Scriptures, was proposed in October 1946 by the president of the Watch Tower Society, Nathan H. Knorr. Work began on December 2, 1947, when the "New World Bible Translation Committee" was formed, composed of Jehovah's Witnesses who professed to be anointed. The Watch Tower Society is said to have "become aware" of the committee's existence a year later. The committee agreed to turn over its translation to the Society for publication and on September 3, 1949, Knorr convened a joint meeting of the board of directors of both the Watch Tower Society's New York and Pennsylvania corporations where he again announced to the directors the existence of the committee and that it was now able to print its new modern English translation of the Christian Greek Scriptures. Several chapters of the translation were read to the directors, who then voted to accept it as a gift. The New World Translation of the Christian Greek Scriptures was released at a Jehovah's Witness convention at Yankee Stadium, New York, on August 2, 1950.

The translation of the Old Testament, which Jehovah's Witnesses refer to as the Hebrew Scriptures, was released in five volumes in 1953, 1955, 1957, 1958, and 1960. The complete New World Translation of the Holy Scriptures was released as a single volume in 1961, and has since undergone various revisions. Cross references which had appeared in the six separate volumes were updated and included in the complete volume in the 1984 revision.

In 1961, the Watch Tower Society began to translate the New World Translation into Dutch, French, German, Italian, Portuguese, and Spanish; the New Testament in these languages was released simultaneously in July 1963 in Milwaukee, Wisconsin. By 1989, the New World Translation was translated into eleven languages, with more than 56,000,000 copies printed.

Translators 
The New World Translation was produced by the New World Bible Translation Committee, formed in 1947. This committee is said to have comprised unnamed members of multinational background. The committee requested that the Watch Tower Society not publish the names of its members, stating that they did not want to "advertise themselves but let all the glory go to the Author of the Scriptures, God," adding that the translation, "should direct the reader, not to the translators, but to the Bible’s Author, Jehovah God". The publishers stated that "the particulars of [the New World Bible Translation Committee's members] university or other educational training are not the important thing" and that "the translation testifies to their qualification".

Former high-ranking Watch Tower staff have identified various members of the translation team. Former governing body member Raymond Franz listed Nathan H. Knorr, Fredrick W. Franz, Albert D. Schroeder, George D. Gangas, and Milton G. Henschel as members of the translation team, adding that only Frederick Franz had sufficient knowledge in biblical languages. Referring to the identified members, evangelical minister Walter Ralston Martin said, "The New World Bible translation committee had no known translators with recognized degrees in Greek or Hebrew exegesis or translation... None of these men had any university education except Franz, who left school after two years, never completing even an undergraduate degree." Fredrick Franz had stated that he was familiar with not only Hebrew, but with Greek, Latin, Spanish, Portuguese, German, and French for the purpose of biblical translation.

Translation Services Department 

In 1989, a Translation Services Department was established at the world headquarters of Jehovah's Witnesses, overseen by the Writing Committee of the Governing Body. The goal of the Translation Services Department was to accelerate Bible translation with the aid of computer technology. Previously, some Bible translation projects lasted twenty years or more. Under the direction of the Translation Services Department, translation of the Old Testament in a particular language may be completed in as little as two years. During the period from 1963 to 1989, the New World Translation became available in ten additional languages. Since the formation of the Translation Services Department in 1989, there has been a significant increase in the number of languages in which the New World Translation has been made available.

2013 revision 

At the Watch Tower Society's annual meeting on October 5, 2013, a significantly revised translation was released. Referring to the new revision, the publishers stated, "There are now about 10 percent fewer English words in the translation. Some key Biblical terms were revised. Certain chapters were changed to poetic format, and clarifying footnotes were added to the regular edition."

The Pericope Adulterae (John 7:53 – 8:11) and the Short and Long Conclusions of Mark 16 (Mark 16:8–20)—offset from the main text in earlier editions—were removed. The new revision was also released as part of an app called JW Library. As of April 2020, the 2013 edition of the New World Translation has been translated into 31 languages.

Translation 
According to the Watch Tower Society, the New World Translation attempts to convey the intended sense of original-language words according to the context. The original New World Translation employs nearly 16,000 English expressions to translate about 5,500 biblical Greek terms, and over 27,000 English expressions to translate about 8,500 Hebrew terms. The translators state that, where possible in the target language, the New World Translation prefers literal renderings and does not paraphrase the original text.

Textual basis 

The master text used for translating the Old Testament into English was Kittel's Biblia Hebraica. The Hebrew texts, Biblia Hebraica Stuttgartensia and Biblia Hebraica Quinta, were used for preparing the latest version of this translation. Other works consulted in preparing the translation include Aramaic Targums, the Dead Sea Scrolls, the Samaritan Torah, the Greek Septuagint, the Latin Vulgate, the Masoretic Text, the Cairo Codex, the Aleppo Codex, Christian David Ginsburg's Hebrew Text, and the Leningrad Codex.

The Greek master text by the Cambridge University scholars B. F. Westcott and F. J. A. Hort (1881) was used as the basis for translating the New Testament into English. The committee also referred to the Novum Testamentum Graece (18th edition, 1948) and to works by Jesuit scholars José M. Bover (1943), and Augustinus Merk (1948). The United Bible Societies' text (1975) and the Nestle-Aland text (1979) were used to update the footnotes in the 1984 version. Additional works consulted in preparing the New World Translation include the Armenian Version, Coptic Versions, the Latin Vulgate, Sistine and Clementine Revised Latin Texts, Textus Receptus, the Johann Jakob Griesbach's Greek text, the Emphatic Diaglott, and various papyri.

Other languages 
Translation into other languages is based on the English text, supplemented by comparison with the Hebrew and Greek. The complete New World Translation has been published in more than one hundred languages or scripts, with the New Testament available in more than fifty additional languages.

When the Writing Committee approves the translation of the Bible into a new language, it appoints a group of baptized Jehovah's Witnesses to serve as a translation team. Translators are given a list of words and expressions commonly used in the English New World Translation with related English words grouped together (e.g. atone, atonement or propitiation). A list of vernacular equivalents is then composed. A database of Greek and Hebrew terms is available where a translator has difficulty rendering a verse. The vernacular terms are then applied to the text in the target language. Further editing and translation is then performed to produce a final version.

Features 
The layout resembles the 1901 edition of the American Standard Version. The translators use the terms "Hebrew-Aramaic Scriptures" and "Christian Greek Scriptures" rather than "Old Testament" and "New Testament", stating that the use of "testament" was based on a misunderstanding of 2 Corinthians 3:14. Headings were included at the top of each page to assist in locating texts; these have been replaced in the 2013 revision by an "Outline of Contents" introducing each Bible book. There is also an index listing scriptures by subject.

Square brackets [ ] were added around words that were inserted editorially, but were removed as of the 2006 printing. Double brackets were used to indicate text considered doubtful. The pronoun "you" was printed in small capitals (i.e., YOU) to indicate plurality, as were some verbs when plurality may be unclear. These features were discontinued in the 2013 release. The New World Translation attempts to indicate progressive rather than completed actions, such as "proceeded to rest" at Genesis 2:2 instead of "rested". The 2013 release indicates progressive verbs only where considered contextually important.

Use of Jehovah 

The name Jehovah is a translation of the Tetragrammaton (transliterated as YHWH, though the original pronunciation is unknown). The New World Translation uses the name Jehovah 6,979 times in the Old Testament. According to the Watch Tower Society, the Tetragrammaton appears in "the oldest fragments of the Greek Septuagint". In reference to the Septuagint, biblical scholar Paul E. Kahle stated, "We now know that the Greek Bible text as far as it was written by Jews for Jews did not translate the Divine name by Kyrios, but the Tetragrammaton written with Hebrew or Greek letters was retained in such MSS (manuscripts). It was the Christians who replaced the Tetragrammaton by Kyrios, when the divine name written in Hebrew letters was not understood any more." However, according to professor Albert Pietersma, since pre-Christian times adonai and the Tetragrammaton were considered equivalent to the Greek term kyrios. Pietersma stated, "The translators felt no more bound to retain the tetragram in written form than they felt compelled to render distinctively Hebrew el, elohim or shaddai." He also considers that old manuscripts containing the tetragram, like the papyrus Fouad 266, "is evidence of a secondary stage."

The New World Translation also uses the name Jehovah 237 times in the New Testament where the extant texts use only the Greek words kyrios (Lord) and theos (God). The use of Jehovah in the New Testament is very rare, but not unique to the New World Translation. Walter Martin, an evangelical minister, wrote, "It can be shown from literally thousands of copies of the Greek New Testament that not once does the tetragrammaton appear." However, the translators of the New World Translation believed that the name Jehovah was present in the original manuscripts of the New Testament when quoting from the Old Testament, but replaced with the other terms by later copyists. Based on this reasoning, the translators consider to have "restored the divine name", though it is not present in any extant manuscripts.

Editions 
In 1984, a Reference edition of the New World Translation was released in addition to a revision of the regular volume. The regular edition includes several appendices containing arguments for various translation decisions, maps, diagrams and other information; and over 125,000 cross references. The reference edition contains the cross references and adds footnotes about translation decisions and additional appendices that provide further detail relating to certain translation decisions and doctrinal views. The Reference edition is out of print as of the release of the 2013 revision of the New World Translation.

Kingdom Interlinear Translation of the Greek Scriptures 
The New World Bible Translation Committee included the English text from the New World Translation in its 1969 and 1985 editions of The Kingdom Interlinear Translation of the Greek Scriptures. It also incorporates the Greek text published by Westcott and Hort in The New Testament in the Original Greek and a literal word-for-word translation.

Non-print editions 
In 1978, the Watch Tower Society began producing recordings of the New World Translation on audio cassette, with the New Testament released by 1981 and the Old Testament in three albums released by 1990. In 2004, the NWT was released on compact disc in MP3 format in major languages. Since 2008, audio downloads of the NWT have been made available in 18 languages in MP3 and AAC formats, including support for podcasts.

In 1983, the English Braille edition of the New World Translations New Testament was released; the complete English Braille edition was released by 1988. NWT editions have since become available in several additional Braille scripts. Production of the NWT in American Sign Language began in 2006; the New Testament was made available by 2010, and the complete ASL edition was released in February 2020.

In 1992, a digital edition of the New World Translation of the Holy Scriptures—With References was released on floppy disk. Since 1994, the New World Translation of the Holy Scriptures—With References has been included in the Watchtower Library on CD-ROM. Both editions of the New World Translation are available online in various languages and digital formats.
Since 2015, a Study Edition of the New World Translation has been gradually released online starting with the books of the New Testament, based on the 2013 revision with additional reference material.

Critical review

Overall review 
In its review of Bible translations released from 1955 to 1985, The HarperCollins Bible Dictionary listed the New World Translation among the major modern translations.

In 1982, Pentecostal theologian Gordon Fee and Douglas K. Stuart in their How to Read the Bible for All Its Worth refer to the New World Translation without a critical examination or discussion as being an "extremely literal translation" filled with "heretical doctrines". In 1985, Alan Stewart Duthie responded to the assertion by Fee & Stuart that the NWT is "filled with the heretical doctrines of this cult", stating that although "there are some heretical doctrines to be found ... [it] does not reach even 0.1% of the whole, which is very far from 'full'".

Cees Houtman wrote in 1984: "respect and knowledge are the requirements that a translator must meet. It was noted above that in the past distrust was often expressed regarding the translation work of persons belonging to a different modality or denomination and there was a fear of the theological points of view being reflected in the translation. A purely objective evaluation of translations, however, must conclude that only in very exceptional cases can passages be pointed out in which the confessional (or political and social) point of view of the translators shines through. Even the New World Translation of the Jehovah's Witnesses can survive the scrutiny of the critics. In this context, one should also note, for example, that Remonstrants and Mennonites were able to use the SV [(Statenvertaling)]. Scripture and religious beliefs tend to come to light in notes and introductions to translations."

In 2004, Anthony Byatt and Hal Flemings published their anthology Your Word is Truth', Essays in Celebration of the 50th Anniversary of the New World Translation of the Holy Scriptures (1950, 1953). They included essays responding to criticism of the New World Translation from non-Witnesses, and a bibliography of reviews of the work.

George D. Chryssides stated in 2019 that the unfavourable criticisms by Harold Henry Rowley, Julius R. Mantey and William Barclay "were extremely vague", but that Bruce M. Metzger "mentioned a few specific passages which he believed were wrongly translated."

Old Testament 

Regarding the New World Translations use of English in the first volume of the New World Translation of the Hebrew Scriptures (Genesis to Ruth, 1953), biblical scholar Harold Henry Rowley was critical of what he called "wooden literalism" and "harsh construction". He characterized these as "an insult to the Word of God", citing various verses of Genesis as examples. Rowley concluded, "From beginning to end this [first] volume is a shining example of how the Bible should not be translated." He added in a subsequent review that "the second volume shows the same faults as the first." While a member of the denomination, Rolf Furuli—a former professor in Semitic languages—said that a literal translation that follows the sentence structure of the source language rather than target language must be somewhat wooden and unidiomatic. Furuli added that Rowley's assessment based on his own preference for idiomatic translations ignores the NWT's stated objective of being as literal as possible.

Samuel Haas, in his 1955 review of the first volume of the NWT in the Journal of Biblical Literature, stated that he did not agree with the introduction of the name Jehovah: "religious bias is shown most clearly in the policy of translating the tetragrammaton as Jehovah." He concluded, "this work indicates a great deal of effort and thought as well as considerable scholarship, it is to be regretted that religious bias was allowed to colour many passages."

In 1960, Frederick William Danker wrote, "not to be snubbed is the New World Translation of the Hebrew Scriptures, Rendered from the Original by the New World Translation Committee... 'the orthodox' do not possess all the truth, yet one does well to 'test the spirits'."

In 1981, biblical scholar Benjamin Kedar-Kopfstein stated that the Old Testament work is largely based on the formal structure of biblical Hebrew. In 1989, Kedar-Kopfstein said, "In my linguistic research in connection with the Hebrew Bible and translations, I often refer to the English edition of what is known as the 'New World Translation.' In so doing, I find my feeling repeatedly confirmed that this work reflects an honest endeavor to achieve an understanding of the text that is as accurate as possible. Giving evidence of a broad command of the original language, it renders the original words into a second language understandably without deviating unnecessarily from the specific structure of the Hebrew. ... Every statement of language allows for a certain latitude in interpreting or translating. So the linguistic solution in any given case may be open to debate. But I have never discovered in the 'New World Translation' any biased intent to read something into the text that it does not contain." In 1993 Kedar-Kopfstein said that the NWT is one of his occasionally quoted reference works.

New Testament 

Negative criticism of the New World Translation is particularly concentrated on Christological issues, mainly the translation of the word kurios (Greek: κύριος) as "Jehovah"—usually translated "Lord" by the classical translators and its rendering of John 1:1.

Edgar J. Goodspeed, translator of the New Testament in An American Translation, positively criticized the New World translation. According to the October 15, 1999 issue of The Watchtower, Goodspeed wrote to the Watch Tower Society in 1950 stating, "I am interested in the mission work of your people, and its world wide scope, and much pleased with the free, frank and vigorous translation. It exhibits a vast array of sound serious learning, as I can testify."

Steven T. Byington said in 1950, "the book does not give enjoyable continuous reading; but if you are digging for excellent or suggestive renderings, this is among the richer mines."

In 1952, religious writer Alexander Thomson wrote of the New World Translation: "The translation is evidently the work of skilled and clever scholars, who have sought to bring out as much of the true sense of the Greek text as the English language is capable of expressing. ... We heartily recommend the New World Translation of the Christian Greek Scriptures, published in 1950 by the Watch Tower Bible and Tract Society." In 1959, Thomson added that on the whole the version was quite a good one, even though it was padded with many English words which had no equivalent in the Greek or Hebrew.

Allen Wikgren (member of the New Revised Standard Version committee, as well as the committee which produced the USB Greek text) said in 1952, "independent readings of merit often occur in other modern speech versions, such as Verkyl's New Testament (1945) and the Jehovah's Witnesses' edition of the New Testament (1950)".

In 1953, former American Bible Society board member Bruce M. Metzger concluded that "on the whole, one gains a tolerably good impression of the scholarly equipment of the translators," but identified instances where the translation has been written to support Jehovah's Witness doctrines, with "several quite erroneous renderings of the Greek." Metzger said there were a number of "indefensible" characteristics of the translation, including its use of "Jehovah" in the New Testament.

J. Carter Swaim in 1953 wrote that "objection is sometimes made to new translations on the ground that to abolish archaic phrases tends to cheapen the Scripture". Referring to the New World Translation of the Christian Greek Scriptures he added: "it is a translation that has its own peculiarities, and its own excellences too. The Witnesses, who are enthusiastic in the spread of their tenets, regard this as one of their most effective devices".

In 1954, Unitarian theologian Charles Francis Potter stated about the New World Translation: "Apart from a few semantic peculiarities like translating the Greek word stauros as 'stake' instead of 'cross', and the often startling use of the colloquial and the vernacular, the anonymous translators have certainly rendered the best manuscript texts, both Greek and Hebrew, with scholarly ability and acumen."

Frederick E. Mayer wrote in 1954: "It is a version that lends support to denial of doctrines which the Christian churches consider basic, such as the co-equality of Jesus Christ with the Father, the personhood of the Holy Spirit, and the survival of the human person after physical death. It teaches the annihilation of the wicked, the non-existence of hell, and the purely animal nature of man's soul."

In 1961 F. F. Bruce stated: "some of its distinctive renderings reflect the biblical interpretations which we have come to associate with Jehovah's Witnesses (e. g. 'the Word was a god" in John 1:1)". He also stated that "some of the renderings which are free from a theological tendency strike one as quite good".

In his review in Andover Newton Quarterly Robert M. McCoy reported in 1963: "in not a few instances the New World Translation contains passages which must be considered as 'theological translations.' This fact is particularly evident in those passages which express or imply the deity of Jesus Christ." He concludes: "The translation of the New Testament is evidence of the presence in the movement of scholars qualified to deal intelligently with the many problems of Biblical translation. This translation, as J. Carter Swaim observes, has its peculiarities and its excellences. All in all, it would seem that a reconsideration of the challenge of this movement to the historic churches is in order." 

In 1963, theologian Anthony A. Hoekema wrote, "Their New World Translation of the Bible is by no means an objective rendering of the sacred text into modern English, but is a biased translation in which many of the peculiar teachings of the Watchtower Society are smuggled into the text of the Bible itself."

Samuel MacLean Gilmour said in 1966: "the New World translation was made by a committee whose membership has never been revealed-a committee that possessed an unusual competence in Greek ... It is clear that doctrinal considerations influenced many turns of phrase, but the work is no crack-pot or pseudo-historical fraud.

In 1967, Robert H. Countess wrote that the "NWT has certain praiseworthy features—for example, an apparatus criticus—everyone must admit", but described the NWT's rendering of "a god" at John 1:1 as "most unfortunate for several reasons". In 1982, in his critical analysis The Jehovah's Witness' New Testament he wrote that the NWT "must be viewed as a radically biased piece of work. At some points it is actually dishonest. At others it is neither modern nor scholarly."

Julius R. Mantey, co-author of A Manual Grammar of the Greek New Testament and A Hellenistic Greek Reader, said in 1980 that the NWT's rendering of John 1:1 is "a shocking mistranslation" and "Obsolete and incorrect".

In October 1996, James Parkinson stated, "the Jehovah's Witnesses'  New World Translation (NWT, 1950) offers a relatively accurate translation from a different theological perspective. Like Rotherham, though, it is often not smooth reading."

Theologian William Barclay concluded, "the deliberate distortion of truth by this sect is seen in the New Testament translation. ... It is abundantly clear that a sect which can translate the New Testament like that is intellectually dishonest."

Theologian John Ankerberg accused the New World Translations translators of renderings that conform "to their own preconceived and unbiblical theology." John Weldon and Ankerberg cite several examples wherein they consider the NWT to support theological views overriding appropriate translation.

The 2003 edition of the New Catholic Encyclopedia states, "[Jehovah's Witnesses] are allowed no other books than the Bible and the society's own publications, which includes its own translation of the Bible with an impressive critical apparatus. The work is excellent except when scientific knowledge comes into conflict with the accepted doctrines of the movement. In their so-called New World Translation, the term Kyrios is rendered Jehovah instead of Lord everywhere in the New Testament (237 times) except at Philippians 2.11, where St. Paul refers the word to Christ."

In 2004, historian Jason BeDuhn examined New Testament passages in which he believed "bias is most likely to interfere with translation" from nine of "the Bibles most widely in use in the English-speaking world". For each passage, he compared the Greek text with the renderings of each English translation, and looked for biased attempts to change the meaning. BeDuhn said that the New World Translation was "not bias free", adding that whilst the general public and various biblical scholars might assume that the differences in the New World Translation are the result of religious bias, he considered it to be "the most accurate of the translations compared", and a "remarkably good translation". He added that "most of the differences are due to the greater accuracy of the NW as a literal, conservative translation". Despite his positive review, BeDuhn said the introduction of the name "Jehovah" into the New Testament 237 times was "not accurate translation by the most basic principle of accuracy", and that it "violate[s] accuracy in favor of denominationally preferred expressions for God". In rebuttal, Thomas Howe strongly criticized BeDuhn's positive review of the New World Translation, stating that BeDuhn's main goal is to deny the deity of Christ.

In 2008, Kenneth J. Baumgarten and Kevin Gary Smith published an article in the South African Theological Seminary's journal, Conspectus, entitled, "An Examination of the Consistency of the New World Translation with the Stated Philosophy of the Translators", in which they studied the use of "the Greek term θεός in reference to Jesus Christ" and concluded that "in seven of the nine sample texts, the NWT violates one or more of its stated translation values and principles. The most common violation is its pervasive tendency to subvert the most natural understanding of the Greek text in favour of a ‘preferred religious view’."

George D. Chryssides noted in 2016 that the New World Translation's rendering of passages about Christ's role in the creation of the world—for example, Colossians 1:15-17—are phrased in such a way as to suggest that Christ was created and not, as the Nicene Creed states, "begotten of the Father before all worlds, God of God."

Kingdom Interlinear Translation of the Greek Scriptures 

Thomas Nelson Winter considered the Kingdom Interlinear Translation of the Greek Scriptures to be a "highly useful aid toward the mastery of koine (and classical) Greek," adding that the translation "is thoroughly up-to-date and consistently accurate."

Julius R. Mantey stated that the KIT "changed the readings in scores of passages to state what Jehovah's Witnesses believe and teach. That is a distortion not a translation."

According to the February 1, 1998 issue of The Watchtower, Jason BeDuhn ordered copies of the KIT for his students at Indiana University Bloomington, and wrote that "it is the best interlinear New Testament available".

Controversial passages 

Much criticism of the New World Translation involves the rendering of certain texts in the New Testament considered to be biased in favor of specific Witness practices and doctrines. These include:

 the use of "torture stake" instead of "cross" as the instrument of Jesus' crucifixion;
 the use of the indefinite article ("a") in its rendering of John 1:1 to give "the Word was a god";
 the term "public declaration" at Romans 10:10, which may reinforce the imperative to engage in public preaching;
 the term "taking in knowledge" rather than "know" at John 17:3 (in the 1984 revision), to suggest that salvation is dependent on ongoing study;
 the placement of the comma in Luke 23:43, which affects the timing of the fulfillment of Jesus' promise to the thief at Calvary.

Russia ban 

The New World Translation was banned in Russia in 2017, after the prosecution used quotes from Wikipedia to argue that the translation is extremist and not a true Bible. This decision was questioned by international observers, and even by Alexander Dvorkin, who had previously asked for the Jehovah's Witnesses' organization to be banned.

See also 

 Jehovah's Witnesses publications
 List of Bible translations by language
 List of Watch Tower Society publications

References

Bibliography 

 
 
 
  (Revised and updated edition of Harper's Bible Dictionary, 1st ed. c1985)

Further reading

External links 

 Official webpage

1961 books
1961 in Christianity
Jehovah's Witnesses literature
Bible translations into English
Bible translations into German
Bible translations into Chinese
Bible translations into Swedish
Bible versions and translations